Filippo Sabetti is a professor of political science at McGill University. He holds a bachelor's degree (summa cum laude) in History and Politics from McMaster University (1968), Woodrow Wilson Fellow (1969), a M.A. and a Ph.D. in Political Science from Indiana University (1970 and 1977, respectively). His research interests cover Canadian and Comparative Politics, Social Dilemmas, History of Self-Governance, Religion and Public Life, Political Economy of Crime and Punishment, and Development of Constitutional and Federalist Political Thought. Massive fan of the film Minority Report.

Career

Filippo Sabetti is currently Professor of Political Science and Director of Graduate Studies (Political Science Dept.) at McGill University. He has held other academic and research positions, such as Associate Professor of Political Science at McGill (1980–1999), Adjunct Scholar at the Center for the Study of Federalism at Temple University (1982-1999), and Assistant Professor of Political Science at McGill University (1974–1980).

Professor Sabetti has received over 30 awards and honors. His most recent include: Conference Grants (with Barbara Allen) from Indiana University, Carleton College and Earhart Foundation (May–June 2006); Research Grant from the Earhart Foundation (May 2005); Travel Grant for the Tocqueville Bicentenary Celebration Committee (Graduate Research and Arts, Indiana University, April 2005); and Conference Grant from Liberty Fund (Indianapolis) and Compagnia di San Paolo (Turin) for Symposium on the Decline of Classical Liberalism in America and Europe (2005).

Filippo Sabetti also received supporting grants from several organizations, such as Indiana University (March 2010), UCLA (February 2010), George Mason University (August 2006), Compagnia di San Paolo and Einaudi Center (2004 and 2006), and Scuola Superiore dell’Economia e delle Finanze (2003).

Publications

Books
 Civilization and Self-Government: The Political Thought of Carlo Cattaneo. Lanham, MD: Lexington Books, 2011.
 Alla Ricerca del Buon Governo in Italia. Manduria-Rome: Piero Lacaita Editore, 2004.
 Village Politics and the Mafia in Sicily. San Francisco: ICS Press; and Montreal: McGill-Queen’s University Press, 2002.
 The Search for Good Government: Understanding the Paradox of Italian Democracy.
Montreal: McGill-Queen’s University Press, 2000 (cloth), 2002 (paper) Harold Adam Innis Book Prize for the best English-language book in the social sciences.
 Politica e potere in un comune siciliano. Cosenza: Pellegrini Editore 1993.
 Political Authority in a Sicilian Village. New Brunswick, NJ: Rutgers University Press, 1984.

Editing
 The Practice of Constitutional Development: Vincent Ostrom’s Quest to Understand Human Affairs. Lanham, MD: Lexington Books, 2009 (with Barbara Allen and Mark Sproule-Jones)
 The Struggle to Constitute and Sustain Productive Orders: Vincent Ostrom’s Quest to Understand Human Affairs. Lanham, MD: Lexington Books, 2008 (with Barbara Allen and Mark Sproule-Jones)
 Libertà e liberali in Europa e in America [Liberty and Liberalism in Europe and America]. Milan: Edizioni Guerini e Associati, 2007 (ed.)
 Civilization and Democracy: The Salvemini Anthology of Cattaneo’s Writings. Toronto: University of Toronto Press, 2006 (with Carlo G. Lacaita)
 Italian Politics & Society (no. 60) Spring 2005, 102 pp. (with Anthony C. Masi)
 Italian Politics & Society (no. 59) Fall 2004, 60 pp. (with Anthony C. Masi)
 Il Crimine in America. Cosenza: Pellegrini Editore, 2001 (with Saverio Di Bella and Pierre Tremblay)
 Italian Politics: A Review, vol. 5 (with R. Catanzaro). London: Pinter Publishers, 1991
 Politica in Italia: I fatti dell’anno e le interpretazioni Edizione 90. Bologna: Il Mulino, 1990 (with R. Catanzaro)
 Canadian Federalism: From Crisis to Constitution (with Harold M. Waller and Daniel J. Elazar). Lanham, MD: University Press of America, 1988
 Crisis and Continuity in Canadian Federalism (special issue of Publius, vol. 14, 1984, with H.M. Waller)

References

External links
 Filippo Sabetti’s page (McGill University)

Academic staff of McGill University
McMaster University alumni
Indiana University alumni
Living people
Earhart Foundation Fellows
Year of birth missing (living people)